"Daddy Never Was the Cadillac Kind" is a song written by Dave Gibson and Bernie Nelson, and recorded by American country music band Confederate Railroad.  It was released in 1994 as the lead-off single from their album Notorious.  It peaked at number 9 the United States, and number 7 in Canada. It is their last top ten in the United States to date, while they'd have one more top ten in Canada.

Music video
The music video was directed by Martin Kahan, and is entirely in black and white.

Chart positions

Year-end charts

References

1994 songs
Confederate Railroad songs
1994 singles
Atlantic Records singles
Song recordings produced by Barry Beckett
Songs written by Dave Gibson (American songwriter)